Andrea Corsini (30 November 1302 – 6 January 1373 or 1374) was an Italian Catholic prelate and professed member from the Carmelites who served as the Bishop of Fiesole from 1349 until his death.

Corsini led a wild and dissolute life until a rebuke from his mother moved him to go to the Santa Maria del Carmine church where he resolved to join the Carmelites as a priest and friar. He exercised various roles in the order, until reluctantly he accepted his episcopal position. In order to accept that position, he imposed greater mortifications upon himself than that required by the order, and dedicated himself to the plight of the poor.

Devotion to the late bishop became so profound after his death that miracles were reported at his tomb. The longstanding and popular devotion to Corsini led to Pope Eugene IV confirming his beatification on 21 April 1440 and Pope Urban VIII canonizing him as a saint on 22 April 1629.

Early life
Andrew Corsini was born in Florence on 30 November 1302 into the noble and illustrious Corsini family, one of twelve children born to Nicholas Corsini and Peregrina (some sources suggest Gemma) degli Stracciabende. He was named in honor of Saint Andrew whose feastday it was. Before his birth, his parents dedicated him to God, under the protection of the Blessed Virgin.

He was wild in his youth; extravagance and vice were normal to him and it pained his devout mother. His parents severely rebuked him for his behavior, and he resolved to amend his ways and try to live up to their expectations. He went to the Carmelite monastery at the Santa Maria del Carmine church to consider what course to take and despite the entreaties of his dissolute friends, decided to become a friar.

Carmelite friar
Corsini joined the Carmelites in Florence in 1318 for his novitiate and began a life of great mortification. He was ordained to the priesthood in 1328 and said his first Mass in a hermitage so as to avoid the customary family celebrations. Corsini began preaching in Florence, and was then sent for his studies to the University of Paris and later to Avignon, where he resided in with his cousin Cardinal Pietro Corsini. He returned to Florence in 1332 and was chosen as prior of his convent. He became known as the "Apostle of Florence". In 1348 he was appointed as the order's Tuscan Provincial during the General Chapter meeting in Metz.

Bishop
On 13 October 1349, Pope Clement VI appointed him Bishop of Fiesole. Upon learning of this appointment, the reluctant Corsini went into hiding. An inscription on his tomb states that "he was snatched from the Carmel to the church and the miter of Fiesole". This perhaps gave rise to the legend that he fled, and that a child discovered him at the charterhouse at Enna, and he later accepted the nomination as bishop as the result of a vision.

He redoubled his austerities as bishop, wearing a hair shirt and sleeping on a bed of vine-branches. At Fiesole, just northeast of Florence, he gained a reputation as a peacemaker between rival political factions and for his care of the poor. Pope Urban V sent him to Bologna as a papal legate to heal the breach between the nobles and the people. "His family connections made him acceptable to the nobility and his life of poverty endeared him to the poor and he did succeed in bringing peace."

Corsini appointed two vicars to aid him in governing his diocese, and enforced discipline amongst the diocesan priests. A number of miraculous healings were attributed to his intercession.

It was reported that in 1372 or 1373, as he celebrated Midnight Mass on Christmas Eve, that the Blessed Virgin appeared to him and told him he would leave this world on the Three Kings' feast. It came to pass that he fell ill on Christmas night and died as foretold, on 6 January 1373 or 1374. His remains were moved to Florence in the evening of 2 February 1374 and were later found to be incorrupt upon exhumation in 1385. The location of his burial was damaged in 1771 but his remains were left undisturbed.

Veneration

Miracles so multiplied at his death that Pope Eugene IV permitted a public devotion to him, although it was not confirmed until later. Pope Eugene IV beatified Andrew Corsini on 21 April 1440. Among the miracles attributed to Corsini's intervention was the Florentine victory over the Milanese at the Battle of Anghiari on 29 June 1440. Petitions were lodged in 1465 and 1466 to Pope Paul II requesting the canonization, and the pope appointed a commission to investigate the matter, though it came to no conclusion. Pope Urban VIII canonized Corsini on 22 April 1629.

In 1675 after his canonization the members of the Corsini house had the Corsini Chapel built in the Carmelite church of Santa Maria del Carmine as a more suitable resting place for his remains. Pope Clement XII - born Lorenzo Corsini - erected in the Roman Basilica of Saint John Lateran a magnificent chapel dedicated to his kinsman.

In 1702 or 1703 a statue in his honor was commissioned and placed along the colonnade in Saint Peter's Square.

See also
 Book of the First Monks
 Constitutions of the Carmelite Order
 Santa Maria del Carmine
 Carmelite Rite
 Roman Catholic Diocese of Fiesole
 Saint Andrew Corsini, patron saint archive

References

 Attribution

Further reading
 Attwater, Donald and Catherine Rachel John. The Penguin Dictionary of Saints. 3rd edition. New York: Penguin Books, 1993. .

External links
 Santi e Beati
 Colonnade Statue in Saint Peter's Square

1302 births
14th-century Christian saints
14th-century Italian Roman Catholic bishops
14th-century venerated Christians
Bishops in Tuscany
Carmelites
Carmelite bishops
Carmelite saints
Andrew
Diplomats of the Holy See
Italian Roman Catholic saints
Italian expatriates in France
Medieval Italian saints
Clergy from Florence
University of Paris alumni
Venerated Catholics
Miracle workers
Canonizations by Pope Urban VIII